Morimospasma is a genus of longhorn beetles of the subfamily Lamiinae, containing the following species:

 Morimospasma granulatum Chiang, 1981
 Morimospasma nitidituberculatum  Hua, 1992
 Morimospasma paradoxum Ganglbauer, 1890
 Morimospasma tuberculatum Breuning, 1939

References

Phrissomini